is a railway station on the Tokyu Toyoko Line in Shibuya, Tokyo, Japan, operated by the private railway operator Tokyu Corporation.

Station layout
This station consists of two opposed side platforms serving two tracks. This station can only accommodate eight-car-length trains.

Platforms

History
The station opened on 28 August 1927, 18 months after the Tokyu Toyoko line opened. On March 15, 2013, the Shibuya Station above-ground train platforms closed down to serve the new underground platforms at the same station to serve the through service from the Tokyo Metro Fukutoshin Line Through services. As a result, The line between Daikan-yama and Shibuya Stations had to be replaced with a new section of underground track. On the morning of 16 March 2013 Tokyu Corporation started construction on converting the upwards slope at Daikan-yama station downwards. This included doing the same to the tracks and platforms to accommodate the new underground section. A total of 1,200 engineers worked 3 hours and 25 minutes throughout the night to lower the slope downwards.

Surrounding area
The station serves an area where many foreign embassies are located. The area is also famous for its stylish neighborhoods with many sidewalk cafes, patisseries, restaurants, and from high fashion boutiques to vintage clothing shops. Between Shibuya and Ebisu stations, it is located on the western plateau of Shibuya on the Tokyu Toyoko Line nestled between the Meguro and Shibuya Rivers.

See also
 List of railway stations in Japan

References

External links

 Tokyu station information 

Tokyu Toyoko Line
Stations of Tokyu Corporation
Railway stations in Tokyo
Railway stations in Japan opened in 1927